Lorbeer is the German word for laurel. It may refer to:

G. W. Lorbeer -botanist of the early 20th century
James W. Lorbeer -American botanist and professor at Cornell University
Johan Lorbeer -a German street performer
Lorbeer Middle School -school in Diamond Bar, California